Harijs is a Latvian masculine given name and may refer to:
Harijs Fogelis (????–????), a Latvian football forward
Harijs Lazdiņš (1910–1988), a Latvian football goalkeeper
Harijs Mellups (1927–1950), a Latvian football and ice hockey player
Harijs Pikols (1903–198?), a Latvian footballer, Olimpija Liepāja football club founder
Harijs Vītoliņš (born 1968), a Latvian professional ice hockey centre

Latvian masculine given names